Hey Trouble is the third studio album by The Concretes, and their first after the departure of lead vocalist Victoria Bergsman. It was preceded by the release of the single "Kids" on 14 March 2007.

Track listing
"Hey Trouble" – 1:27
"A Whale's Heart" – 3:57
"Kids" – 3:45
"Firewatch" – 3:45
"Didion" – 4:50
"Oh Boy" – 2:44
"Keep Yours" – 2:35
"If We're Lucky We Don't Get There on Time" – 3:18
"Souvenirs" – 3:24
"Are You Prepared" – 3:06
"Oh No" – 3:52
"Simple Song" – 4:06

Personnel
Maria Eriksson
Martin Hansson
Ulrik Janusson
Lisa Milberg
Per Nystrom
Ludvig Rylander
Daniel Varjo
Music by The Concretes; Lyrics by Lisa Milberg

References

External links
 Track By Track by Lisa Milberg

2007 albums
The Concretes albums
Licking Fingers albums